The siege of Pyongyang was part of the Japanese invasions of Korea. Konishi Yukinaga, a Japanese daimyō, captured Pyongyang and garrisoned his force in the winter of 1592.

Background
Following the capture of Kaesong following the Battle of Imjin River, the Japanese invasion armies split up into three groups. Kuroda Nagamasa led his forces west into Hwanghae Province, and Kato Kiyomasa to the east into Hamgyong Province. The main force, under Konishi Yukinaga, proceeded north into Pyongan Province. His vanguard reached the south bank of the  Taedong River on 16 July within sight of the walls of Pyongyang. A few days later, he was joined by Kuroda Nagamasa's army, which had completed its sweep through Hwanghae Province without opposition. Unable to cross the river they waited there, sending a letter to King Seonjo urging his surrender. A parley mid-river led to no results. 

King Seonjo fled Pyeongyang on 19 July and made his way to Yeongbyeon. Although the city had strong fortifications and was well supplied with troops and supplies, the departure of the king severely impacted the morale of the defenders, and the populace began to flee in panic.  Korean General Gim Myeongweon, together with government minister Yun Doo-su, were left in charge of the defenses with nominally 10,000 men under their command.

Battle
Rather than wait for the Japanese offensive, Gim decided to make a surprise night attack with a small contingent, after observing that Japanese camp security was lax at night. It took the Koreans longer to cross the river in darkness than anticipated, and the actual attack did not occur until near dawn. Initially successful, the Koreans managed to kill several hundred enemies before the Japanese realized what had happened. Kuroda Nagamasa counterattacked, pushing the Koreans back to the river. However, at the riverbank, the Korean army found that their boats were gone, the boatsmen having fled when they heard sounds of the Japanese gunfire. Unable to escape across the river, they retreated upstream where the river was shallow enough to ford. This inadvertently gave the Japanese vital information - to a path across the river to the city.

Realizing that the Japanese attack was coming, Gim had his remaining men sink their cannon and arms into a pond to prevent them from falling into the hands of the Japanese, and fled north to Sunan. The Japanese crossed the river on 24 July and found the city completely deserted. Suspecting a trap, Konishi and Kuroda sent scouts to a nearby hill to confirm before entering the empty city. Within the city's warehouses, they found seven thousand tons of rice, which would be enough to feed their army for several months.

Aftermath
The Japanese occupation of Pyeongyang would not be contested until Ming general Zhao Chengxun arrived with 6,000 men on 23 August 1592.

See also 
List of battles during the Japanese invasions of Korea (1592–1598)
Siege of Pyongyang (1593)

Notes

Bibliography

 
 
 
 
 
 
 
 
 
 
 桑田忠親 [Kuwata, Tadachika], ed., 舊參謀本部編纂, [Kyu Sanbo Honbu], 朝鮮の役 [Chousen no Eki]　(日本の戰史 [Nihon no Senshi] Vol. 5), 1965.
 
 
 
 
 
 
 
 
 
 
 
 
  
 
 
 
 
 
 

Pyongyang
History of Pyongyang
1592 in Asia
Pyongyang
Pyongyang